The counts of Toggenburg (Grafen von Toggenburg) ruled the Toggenburg region of today's canton of St. Gallen, Switzerland, and adjacent areas during the 13th to 15th centuries.

A baronial family of Toggenburg is mentioned in the 11th and 12th centuries, but their genealogical connection to the comital family is unclear. They are named for their ancestral seat, now known as Alt-Toggenburg, near Kirchberg, St. Gallen.
The castle was built in the 10th or 11th century, and was destroyed in 1085 in a conflict with the Abbot of St. Gallen, later rebuilt and in 1226 given to St. Gallen Abbey by count Diethelm of Toggenburg.

The  family is attested from the early 13th century, as Toccanburg, later Tochimburc. Diethelm I (possible mention 1176, died 1205 or 1207) was followed by Diethelm II (possible mention 1210, died c. 1230). Either of these was the beneficiary of the inheritance of a number of local noble families (among these Alt-Rapperswil) in c. 1200 and adopted the title of comes (count) from 1209. In 1187, one Werner of Toggenburg became abbot of Einsiedeln.
The legend of a Saint Ida of Toggenburg is recorded in 1481, making her the wife of a count of Toggenburg, possibly either Diethelm, or one Heinrich. According to the legend, the husband defenestrated his innocent wife on suspicion of adultery. She survived and lived as an anchoress in Fischingen. Her veneration there is attested for 1410.

The early counts were in competition with St. Gallen Abbey, the bishops of Constance and the counts of Kyburg. The inheritance disputes motivated the donation of religious establishments in  Bubikon, Rüti, Oberbollingen and Wurmsbach in the 1190s, and a fratricide by one Diethelm (fl. 1209–36) of his brother Rudolf in 1226.

On 23 April 1398 Count Donat von Toggenburg donated the church of Elsow as benefice for the new Allerheiligenaltar at the grave of the Toggenburg family, for the "salvation of the soul of his daughter Menta von Toggenburg" who had died shortly before. Count Fridrich von Toggenburg, Herr zu Brettengow und Tafas donated to "his own and the salvation of his ancestors who were buried" (at the Rüti church) "and where he also expects to be buried," the church, rights and lands (Kirchwidem and Kirchensatz) in Wangen in der March to the Rüti Abbey, sealed by Fridrich and the knights Herman von Landenberg, Johans von Bonstetten from Ustra and Herman von der Hochenlandenberg on 21 January 1407.

In 1436, the death of the last count, Frederick VII, Count of Toggenburg, led to the Old Zurich War over the succession.
Friedrich VII was later buried in a chapel, the so-called Toggenburger Kapelle (capella nova in latere monasterii de novo construxit) given by his noble wife, Elisabeth Countess of Toggenburg, née von Mätsch. Elisabeth spent her last days in the Rüti Abbey, writing on 20 June 1442 that she had retreated there (unser wesen gentzlich in dasselbe gotzhus got zuo dienende gezogen habe) and desired her tomb to be with her husband's. On 11 June 1443 marauding troops of the Old Swiss Confederacy devastated the monastery and desecrated the bodies of the nobles, including Count Friedrich VII whom they held responsible for the war with Zürich. 14 members of the family were buried in the Toggenburg vault in the church of the Rüti Abbey.

List of counts

House of Toggenburg

References

Bibliography
  Cawley, Charles (2001), Medieval Lands - Foundation for Medieval Genealogy, Grafen von Toggenburg, fmg.ac

 
Medieval Switzerland
Toggenburg
History of the canton of St. Gallen
House of Toggenburg
Counties of the Holy Roman Empire
Former countries